The Walls of Hell, also known as Intramuros is a 1964 Philippine-American film directed by Eddie Romero and Gerardo de Leon and starring Jock Mahoney. The film was made back-to-back with Moro Witch Doctor (1964). It was produced by Hemisphere Pictures (owned by Eddie Romero, Irwin Pizor and Kane W. Lynn).

Synopsis
In World War II during the Battle of Manila, fanatical Japanese soldiers fighting for their lives barricade themselves inside the walls of "Intramuros", the ancient Spanish walled city of Manila. The United States artillery is bombing them continuously, and the Japanese are holding thousands of innocent Filipino citizens hostage. An American reporter named Murray (Paul Edwards Jr.) arrives at the front where a guerrilla unit led by a Lt. Sorenson (Jock Mahoney) makes contact with a young Filipino guerilla named Nardo (Fernando Poe Jr.) who had escaped from Intramuros through a sewer tunnel. Nardo tells Sorenson that his wife is among the prisoners and that the sewer system can be used to rescue the hostages. As shells rain down on the walled city, the American forces invade the area. Sorenson is reunited with his wife, and the military forces its way into the burning city.

Cast
 Jock Mahoney as Lt. Jim Sorenson
 Fernando Poe Jr. as Sgt. Nardo Maglaya
 Michael Parsons as Papa
 Oscar Roncal as Joker
 Paul Edwards Jr. as Murray
 Ely Ramos Jr. as Jose
 Fred Galang as Pedring
 Vance Skarstedt as Maj. Briggs
 Cecilia Lopez as Tina
 Arsenio Alonzo
 Claude Wilson as Major
 Pedro Navarro
 Carpi Asturias
 Andres Centenera
 Paquito Salcedo
 Alex Swanbeck
 Tommy Romulo
 Willie Salcedo
 Angel Buenaventura
 George Kramer

See also 
 The Ravagers (film)
 Moro Witch Doctor
 Santiago! (film)
 Manila, Open City
 Aguila (film)

References

External links

The Walls of Hell at TCMDB

Films directed by Eddie Romero
1964 films
Films shot in the Philippines
Philippine war films
Pacific War films
1964 war films